Caripeta aretaria, the southern pine looper, is a species of geometrid moth in the family Geometridae. It is found in North America.

The MONA or Hodges number for Caripeta aretaria is 6869.

References

Further reading

External links

 

Ourapterygini
Articles created by Qbugbot
Moths described in 1860